Cascia is a town and comune (municipality) of the Italian province of Perugia in a rather remote area of the mountainous southeastern corner of Umbria. It is about 21 km from Norcia on the road to Rieti in the Lazio (63 km). It is also very close to Terni.

History
The modern territory of Cascia was the home of the Roman settlement of Carsulae, destroyed in the 1st century BC by an earthquake. In the Middle Ages it was sacked by the Byzantines and the Lombards, and was later a fief of the Trinci family. It was occupied by Papal troops in the 15th century, and thenceforth it was a Papal town until the unification of Italy in 1860.

Cascia was the home of Saint Rita of Cascia, who was born in the nearby frazione of Roccaporena in 1381 and died there in 1457. After her canonization in 1900, a large shrine, with the Basilica of Santa Rita da Cascia, was built in Cascia, which is still an important place of pilgrimage; and the house where she was born may still be visited.

The town also is home to the frescoed 14th-century church of Sant’Antonio Abate.

Frazioni
Atri, Avendita, Buda, Castel San Giovanni, Castel Santa Maria, Cerasola, Chiavano, Civita, Colforcella, Collegiacone, Colmotino, Coronella, Fogliano, Logna, Maltignano, Ocosce, Onelli, Opagna, Poggio Primocaso, Roccaporena, San Giorgio, Santa Anatolia, Trognano, Villa San Silvestro, Santa Trinità, Fustagna, Piandoli, Giappiedi, Capanne di Collegiacone, Sciedi, Valdonica, Capanne di Roccaporena, Tazzo, Manigi, Serviglio, Colle Santo Stefano, Puro, Palmaiolo.

References

External links
Umbria.Org - Article about Cascia 
Bill Thayer's site - Article about Cascia

(Incorporates text from Bill Thayer's site, by permission.)

Cities and towns in Umbria